The 1999 24 Hours of Le Mans was the 67th 24 Hours of Le Mans, and took place on 12 and 13 June 1999. The race had a large number of entries in the fastest Le Mans Prototype classes, with Audi, BMW, Ferrari, Lola Cars, Mercedes-Benz, Nissan, Panoz, Riley & Scott, and Toyota all represented. The BMW V12 LMR of Yannick Dalmas, Pierluigi Martini, and Joachim Winkelhock won overall, with their car's reliability and fuel economy allowing them to beat their faster rivals.

Pre-race 

1999 saw another increase in manufacturers involvement.  Although Porsche did not send a team to contest in the prototype classes, Toyota retained their three updated GT-Ones, now moved to the LMGTP class due to the demise of GT1, while Mercedes-Benz debuted three new CLR LMGTPs.  Nissan instead moved from GT1 to an open cockpit LMP, as did Panoz.

Newcomer Audi attempted to try their hand at both classes, with two open cockpit R8Rs and two closed cockpit R8Cs.  BMW continued with their open cockpit LMPs, updating to the new V12 LMR. The works V12 LMR's were run by Schnitzer Motorsport, while two of the previous year's cars were privately entered.

Mercedes CLR incidents 
The event saw three major crashes involving the team of Mercedes-Benz CLRs during qualifying and the race itself. The CLR had a very short wheelbase and a large amount of overhang (the bodywork outside the wheelbase), resulting in high pitch sensitivity. The amount of overhang and its resulting pitch sensitivity was enough to cause aerodynamic and chassis design flaws with the car. The large amount of overhang allowed for amounts of air to build up underneath the nose of the car, and the amount of air that built up underneath the CLR thanks to the car's frontal pitch being high enough was enough to imbalance the frontal aerodynamics, giving this section more lift than downforce, which allowed the car to take off into the air, especially when following another car and at the tops of hills, when a car's front pitch is at its highest- such as on the run to Indianapolis and on the Mulsanne Straight.

Mark Webber's CLR #4 went airborne at Indianapolis during Thursday night qualifying. On Friday, the team was allowed to rebuild #4 on a new chassis, with tweaks to the rear suspension, in an attempt by Mercedes to cure the problem. Winglets were fitted to the front to increase downforce. All cars had qualified, but during the brief warm-up on Saturday morning, Webber again went airborne when tailing his teammates over the hump of the Mulsanne, landing on his roof and skidding to a stop in the Mulsanne corner. This car was withdrawn from the race, but the two other CLRs continued on, again with emergency tweaks in yet another attempt to alleviate the instability.

A few hours into the race on lap 75, Peter Dumbreck's CLR #5 also went airborne at a crest just before the Indianapolis corner (a very bumpy section of the track), this time flying off the side of the track and landing in the trees. This incident, unlike the previous two, was actually caught by TV cameras and thus broadcast worldwide. Mercedes-Benz immediately withdrew the remaining CLR #6 and dropped out of sportscar racing for the immediate future.

This was the second time Mercedes-Benz had dropped out of Le Mans and sportscar racing following an incident with one of their cars becoming airborne and leaving the track, the first being the 1955 Le Mans disaster.

Race 
In the early part of the race, the top qualifying #1 and #2 Toyotas driven by Martin Brundle and Thierry Boutsen fought with the #6 Mercedes driven by Bernd Schneider, and the #5 Mercedes driven by Christophe Bouchut.  The #17 BMW was never far behind and used its superior fuel economy to gain the lead through the pit stops.  Toyota #1, #2, Mercedes #6 and BMW #17 all led the race at various points.  At 8pm, 5 hours into the race the #17 BMW lead the race with #2 Toyota 2nd, #5 Mercedes 3rd and #6 Mercedes 4th.  It was during this fight for second and third place when Dumbreck's crash occurred.  This led to the immediate withdrawal of the remaining #6 Mercedes.

Following a lengthy safety car period as a result of Dumbreck's accident, Brundle retired the #1 Toyota at 11:30pm.  He was trying to claw back time from an earlier mechanical issue when he suffered a puncture at high speed on braking for the first chicane on the Mulsanne Straight.  The puncture sent the car veering sideways into the barrier, badly damaging the rear suspension. Brundle tried to get the car back to the pits but eventually stopped at Arnage. At the front the race was still between the #17 BMW and the #2 Toyota, the Toyota having the superior pace but the BMW able to go further on each tank of fuel. Following them were the #15 BMW and the #3 Toyota. At around 2am, the #2 Toyota being driven by Thierry Boutsen suffered a high speed crash under the Dunlop bridge, following a collision with a slower car that was being overtaken.  The car was destroyed and Boutsen had to be extracted from the car suffering from an injury to his lower back. The Belgian driver ended his racing career after this accident.

By dawn, the #17 BMW was four laps in front of its sister 15 BMW. At approximately 10am, JJ Lehto driving #17 BMW suffered a stuck throttle and crashed in the Porsche curves. The front of the car was badly damaged and it could not continue. This left the sister #15 BMW almost a lap ahead of the #3 Toyota. With this sniff of a win Ukyo Katayama set the fastest lap of the race of 3:35. He narrowed the gap to less than a minute when another tyre blowout befell the Toyota team. However, Katayama was able to return to the pits for new tyres and continue. By then bar any problems for the BMW the race was out of reach. Audi came in 3rd at their first attempt at Le Mans.

The 1999 race was the last for several of the major manufacturers. Only Audi returned for 2000. Mercedes pulled out of sports car racing altogether following the CLR incidents and concentrated on the new German Deutsche Tourenwagen Masters (DTM) series, BMW concentrated their efforts on their supply of engines to the Williams team in Formula One (who had built the BMW LMRs). Toyota also pulled out as despite their pace over 1998 and 1999, only one of their cars finished the race over both of those years. Toyota would eventually return to Le Mans in 2012, as well as the 2012 FIA World Endurance Championship and eventually won the race for the first time in 2018.

Official results

Statistics 
 Pole position - #1 Toyota Motorsport / TTE - 3:29.930
 Fastest lap - #3 Toyota Motorsport / TTE - 3:35.052
 Distance - 4968 km
 Average speed - 207 km/h
 Highest trap speed — Toyota GT-One - 352 km/h (practice)

References 

Le Mans
24 Hours of Le Mans races
24 Hours of Le Mans